We Got This is the debut album from the New Orleans rap group, Chopper City Boyz, led by rapper B.G.  It was released on February 27, 2007.  The first single off the album is "Make 'Em Mad", produced by David Banner.

The album debuted at #21 on the Billboard 200, selling 27,000 copies in its first week, which was also good for #1 on the Independent Albums chart.

Track listing

Chart positions

References

2007 debut albums
Albums produced by David Banner
Chopper City Boyz albums